Edward Harold "Ed" Strelecki (April 10, 1905 – January 9, 1968) was a Major League Baseball pitcher who played for the St. Louis Browns in  and  and with the Cincinnati Reds in .

External links

1905 births
1968 deaths
St. Louis Browns players
Cincinnati Reds players
Major League Baseball pitchers
Baseball players from Newark, New Jersey